Matt or Matthew Burke may refer to:

Matt Burke (rugby union, born 1973), Australian rugby union player who represented the Wallabies from 1993 to 2004
Matt Burke (rugby, born 1964), Australian rugby union and rugby league player who represented the Wallabies from 1984 to 1987
Matt Burke (American football) (born 1976), American football coach
 Matthew Burke (born c. 1962), financial planner and Republican candidate for the United States House of Representatives elections in Washington, 2010
Matthew Burke (rugby union, born 1997), Irish rugby union player
 DCI Matt Burke, character in the television series Taggart

See also
Matt Birk (born 1973), American politician and former football player